Lueyang County, or Lüeyang County, is a county of Hanzhong, in the southwest of Shaanxi province, China, bordering Gansu province to the north and west and located on the upper reaches of the Jialing River. It was first founded in 111 BC. As a result of the 2008 Sichuan earthquake, 95% of buildings in the county seat were damaged. In August 2020, the county seat was flooded by the Jialing River.

Economy 
Formerly home to heavy industry, nowadays the local economy lags behind the rest of Shaanxi province. In 2014, 41% of the population lived in absolute poverty. Lueyang is an important agricultural base for Eucommia tree, walnuts, black mushroom and Shiitake.

Administrative divisions
As 2019, Lueyang County is divided to 2 subdistricts and 15 towns.
Subdistricts
 Xingzhou Subdistrict, county seat
 Hengxianhe Subdistrict

Towns

Climate

Transport 

 Baoji–Chengdu railway
 China National Highway 345
 G7011 Shiyan–Tianshui Expressway

References

External links
Official website of Lueyang County Government

County-level divisions of Shaanxi
Hanzhong